is  the assistant coach of the Kawasaki Brave Thunders in the Japanese B.League.

Head coaching record

|-
| style="text-align:left;"|Osaka Evessa
| style="text-align:left;"|2018-19
| 60||23||37|||| style="text-align:center;"|4th in Western|||-||-||-||
| style="text-align:center;"|-
|-

References

1985 births
Living people
Iwate Big Bulls coaches
Kawasaki Brave Thunders coaches
Japanese basketball coaches
Osaka Evessa coaches